Overlord, subtitled "The Normandy Invasion", is a board wargame published by Conflict Games in 1973 that simulates the Normandy landings and the subsequent attempt by the Germans to prevent the Allies from breaking out of Normandy during World War II.

Background
On 6 June 1944, Allied forces landed on Normandy beaches and began a month-long struggle to force their way out of Normandy and begin the march to Germany.

Description
Overlord is a two-player wargame in which one player controls Allied invaders, and the other player controls German defenders. The game covers the period of 6 June to 28 August in 28 turns.

Components
The game box contains:
 20" x 23" paper hex grid map scaled at 5 km (3 mi) per hex
 304 die-cut counters 
 4-page rulebook
 errata sheet
various charts and player aids

Gameplay
The game uses a simple alternating "I Go, You Go" system of movement and combat:
German Movement
 German Combat
 Allied Movement
 Allied Combat
The Allied player has a given number of air points, which can be used each turn to aid attacks. Any unused air points can be used to make road travel more costly for German units. The Allies can also use naval bombardment to either aid in attacks or in defense within a certain distance of the beachhead.

Victory conditions
The Allies must exit nine divisions from the east side of the board by the end of Turn 28 to win. The Germans win by preventing this.

Publication history
Inspired by game designer Richard Berg, game store owner John Hill turned to game designing in the early 1970s, and one of his first games was Overlord, published by Hill's company Conflict Games in 1973. 

In a 1976 poll conducted by Simulations Publications Inc. to determine the most popular wargame in North America, Overlord placed 109th out of 202 games. 

Conflict Games published a second edition with new box art in 1977. Diseños Orbitales published a Spanish language edition titled Día D: Operación Overlord in 1992.

Reception
In the December 1974 issue of Airfix Magazine, Bruce Quarrie was generally impressed with the game, saying, "One attractive feature of Conflict games, especially for newcomers to board wargaming, is the simplicity of their rules, and this [game] is no exception, even though naval gunfire support and air power are taken into account as well as action on the ground."

In the inaugural edition of Phoenix, Peter Bolton called Overlord and its sister game Kasserine Pass (another John Hill game, published in 1972) "clean, highly enjoyable games [where] victory conditions can go either way." Bolton noted that "Because of the terrain giving the Germans excellent defensive positions early in the game, the battle tends to follow within reason the actual fighting." However, he believed that Overlord was imbalanced in favor of the Allies — "the game assumes the Allies will eventually prevail."

Other reviews and commentary
Panzerfaust #59
Campaign #84
The Grenadier V.2 #1

References

Board wargames set in Modern history
Conflict Games games
John Hill games
Wargames introduced in 1973
World War II board wargames